Where Once They Stood is a Canadian historical television series which aired on CBC Television in 1979.

Premise
This St. John's-produced series concerned the origins of Canada's settlements.

Scheduling
This series was broadcast Saturdays at 11:00 a.m. (Eastern time) from 7 April to 2 June 1979.

References

External links
 

CBC Television original programming
1979 Canadian television series debuts
1979 Canadian television series endings